One Beacon Street is a modern skyscraper in the Government Center neighborhood of Boston, Massachusetts.  Built in 1972 and refurbished in 1991, it is Boston's 16th-tallest building, standing 505 feet (154 m) tall, and housing 37 floors.  Its position near the top of Beacon Hill gives the building a commanding presence, though it is located away from many other Boston skyscrapers.

The tower houses a broadcast mast on the roof, painted red and white. With its broadcast mast included, One Beacon Street is the 4th-tallest building in Boston (when measuring to pinnacle height), rising 623 feet (190 m). Apart from the mast, the roof of the building is flat and has no crown.

Owners
In July 2014 MetLife and Norges Bank Investment Management announced that they paid approximately $561 million for the One Beacon Street office building.

Tenants
The United States Census Bureau Boston Regional Center is on the 7th Floor.

Aberdeen Standard Investments is on the 34th Floor.

WeWork is on the 15th floor. 
  
Northwestern Mutual, an American financial services mutual organization, occupies the 21st floor. 

Robert M. Currey & Associates, the independent risk management consulting firm, is on the 22nd floor.

The Brattle Group is on the 26th floor. 

The UMass Club is on the 32nd floor 

Architecture and design firm Gensler has a Boston studio on the 2nd and 3rd Floor.

Architecture and design firm NBBJ has a Boston studio on the 5th Floor.

See also

 List of tallest buildings in Boston

References

External links

 One Beacon Street Website
 Emporis.com
 Entry on Skyscraperpage.com

Skyscraper office buildings in Boston
Office buildings completed in 1972
Beacon Hill, Boston
Skidmore, Owings & Merrill buildings